Bryant Baxter Newcomb (August 22, 1867 – February 1, 1945)  was an American Republican Party politician, who served as the Mayor of Long Branch, New Jersey, and served as the Director of the Monmouth County Board of Chosen Freeholders. He was director of the Long Branch Building and Loan Association. He was the business manager for the Monmouth County Publishing Company that published the Daily Record.

Early life
Bowman was born in Landis Township, New Jersey, to Franklin and Caroline Newcombe. His family moved to Long Branch where Franklin worked as a contractor. Bryant attended city primary and secondary schools. He then worked as a bookkeeper and confidential secretary at Bayley and Burns, where he stayed for 18 years.

Career
He served as the Long Branch, New Jersey City Clerk from 1902-1912 before being elected to the City Commission, where he was chosen to serve as Mayor for the years 1912 through 1916. He was the first mayor elected under the commission form of government, a form created by the 1911 Walsh Act. Newcomb was an advocate of the form. In 1913, a recall campaign was instigated against Newcomb and two city commissioners. In 1915, Newcomb organized mayors and prominent property owners along the New Jersey Short to create a coast protection league, of which he was made president. The group sought to organize support in state and national legislation for improved coastal management. After his term, he moved to New York City, where he worked with the banking and brokerage firm of John Nickerson, Jr. He then moved back to Long Branch where he became manager of F. M. Taylor Publishing Co. (Later the Monmouth County Publishing Co.), publishers of the Long Branch Record.

Newcomb was elected to the Board of Chosen Freeholders in the 1918 general election, and served five three year terms. He served as Director of the Board from 1921 through 1933. In the early 1920s, he became president and director of the Long Branch Building and Loan Association, where he worked for 20 years.

Bryant B. Newcomb's tenure on the Board of Freeholders coincided with the increased use of the automobile during the 1920s, and millions of dollars were invested in the county's infrastructure during this time. Newcomb was chairman of the roads committee which supervised construction of $2 million worth of county roads. He also served on the finance committee, bridge committee, jail committee, and surplus fund committee.

In 1933, Newcomb and his running mate, Arthur Johnson, were defeated by Democrats Arthur Pryor and Henry W. Herbert.

After leaving the board, Newcomb retired from politics, remaining in the newspaper business until retiring in 1937. He returned to the paper as business manager emeritus in 1940.

Newcomb also worked as a firefighter with the Atlantic and Independent Fire Companies of the Long Branch Fire Department.

Personal life
Newcomb was married twice. First to Selena Warwick with whom he had three children: Franklin T., Selena W., and Bryant B. Jr. He later married Her sister, Viola M. Warwick with whom he had two sons: W. Howard and Thomas W. His second wife died on February 12, 1936.

He died on February 1, 1945, at Monmouth Memorial Hospital from his injuries he sustained after being struck by a taxicab.

See also
List of Monmouth County Freeholder Directors

Notes and references

1867 births
1945 deaths
County commissioners in New Jersey
New Jersey Republicans
Mayors of Long Branch, New Jersey
Pedestrian road incident deaths
People from Cumberland County, New Jersey